Fulgenzio Gallucci (1570 – 9 November 1632) was a Catholic prelate who served as Bishop of Boiano (1624–1632) and Titular Bishop of Thagaste.

Biography
Fulgenzio Gallucci was born in Montegiorgio, Italy and ordained a priest in the Order of Saint Augustine. On 23 May 1623, he was appointed by Pope Gregory XV as Titular Bishop of Thagaste. On 5 June 1623, he was consecrated bishop by Ottavio Bandini, Cardinal-Bishop of Palestrina, with Ottavio Accoramboni, Archbishop Emeritus of Urbino, and Ludovico Sarego, Bishop Emeritus of Adria as co-consecrators. On 11 March 1624, he was appointed by Pope Urban VIII as Bishop of Boiano. He served as Bishop of Boiano until his death on 9 November 1632.

References

External links and additional sources
 (for Chronology of Bishops) 
 (for Chronology of Bishops) 
 (for Chronology of Bishops) 
 (for Chronology of Bishops) 

1570 births
1632 deaths
17th-century Italian Roman Catholic bishops
Bishops appointed by Pope Gregory XV
Bishops appointed by Pope Urban VIII
Augustinian bishops
People from the Province of Fermo